Survivor Japan: Palau, was the first season of Survivor Japan and it aired from April 9, 2002 to June 18, 2002. This season was set in Ngemelis Islands of Palau. Prior to the tribe merge, one player was sent to the ship from each tribe, and they discussed which camp to live in after the merge. At the final tribal council there seemed to be little doubt in the jury's mind on who deserved to be the Sole Survivor. Eventually, it was diving instructor Eri Minoshima who won the season and 10,000,000 Yen by a vote of 5-0 over priest Daisuke Yoshino. There were six members of the jury, but Junko Matsuo refused to vote for either Daisuke or Eri because she did not believe that either castaway was worthy of being the Sole Survivor.

Finishing Order

Voting History

 Mina was evacuated for medical reasons in episode 8. As a result, that episode's tribal council was cancelled.

 As Daisuke and Satoshi both received three votes at the tenth tribal council, the number of votes each had received at previous tribal councils were counted. The person with the most votes would be eliminated. Daisuke had 4 votes and Satoshi had 6 votes. Therefore, Satoshi was eliminated

 As Eri and Junko both received two votes at the twelfth tribal council, the number of votes each had received at previous tribal councils were counted. Eri had 0 votes and Junko had 4 votes. Therefore, Junko was eliminated.

 In a rule specific to only the Japanese version of Survivor, if a member of the jury believed neither finalist deserved to win, they may refuse to vote. Junko was the only jury member not to vote for either Daisuke or Eri.

External links
http://www.geocities.co.jp/Milkyway-Lynx/9948/index1.html
https://web.archive.org/web/20040806192739/http://www.tbs.co.jp/survivor/1/loosers.html
https://web.archive.org/web/20040407133157/http://www.tbs.co.jp/survivor/1/profile-takanami.html

Japanese game shows
Japan
Television shows filmed in Palau